Jeanne Vidal (12 March 1908 – 27 February 1999) was a French fencer. She competed in the women's individual foil event at the 1932 Summer Olympics.

References

External links
 

1908 births
1999 deaths
French female foil fencers
Olympic fencers of France
Fencers at the 1932 Summer Olympics
20th-century French women